Edhuvas Higajje is a 1996 Maldivian film directed by Easa Shareef. Produced by Aslam Rasheed under Slam Studio, the film stars Reeko Moosa Manik, Wadheefa Adam and Nooma Ibrahim in pivotal roles.

Premise
The film opens with Wadheefa Adam (Wadheefa) spending sleepless nights desperately waiting for husband, Imran (Reeko Moosa Manik) who simply avoids her citing his busy schedule, though Imran is actually having an intimate relationship with his co-actor, Azma (Nooma Ibrahim). Blackmailed, Imran confesses to Wadheefa that he is having an affair with Azma, which leads him to choose between his acquiescent wife and vile girlfriend, in which he chooses the latter. Dejected, Wadheefa relocates to her island and resides at her friend's house. As demanded by Azma, Imran divorces Wadheefa. She meets a charmy guy named Waseem (Mohamed Aboobakuru) at a screen test where he expresses romantic feelings towards her. meanwhile, Azma suffers from hypochondriasis and seeks help from Wadheefa.

Cast 
 Reeko Moosa Manik as Imran
 Wadheefa Adam as Wadheefa
 Nooma Ibrahim as Azma
 Mohamed Aboobakuru as Waseem
 Mohamed Waheed as Mondhu
 Fathimath Didi as Azma's mother
 Chilhiya Moosa Manik as Kasimfulhu
 Azma as Shimana
 Aamina Fulhu as Aamina
 Niru as Baby Niru
 Ibrahim Wisan as Vishan

Soundtrack

Accolades

References

Maldivian drama films
1996 films
Films directed by Easa Shareef
1996 drama films
Dhivehi-language films